Edgar Robert Champlin (November 9, 1858 – November 8, 1932) was a Massachusetts lawyer, banker, and politician who served as the twenty-seventh Mayor of Cambridge, Massachusetts.

Legal career
Champlin attended Harvard Law School, graduating in June 1880.  Champlin also read for the law in the law offices of Richard Henry Dana, Jr. and Lewis S. Dabney.

Even before he graduated from Harvard Law School, Champlin was admitted to the bar, in April 1880.

Family life
Champlin married Katherine E. Paine of Cambridge on December 12, 1883.

Notes

1858 births
1932 deaths
Cambridge, Massachusetts City Council members
Harvard Law School alumni
Mayors of Cambridge, Massachusetts
Massachusetts Republicans